Sir Edward Littleton (died 1705) was an administrator of the English East India Company. He served as President of Bengal in the early eighteenth century.

Littleton was the eldest son of Sir Edward Littleton, 2nd Baronet. He studied at The Queen's College, Oxford, and in 1671 married Susannah, daughter of Sir Theophilus Biddulph. From 1685 until 1689, he sat as Member of Parliament (MP) for Staffordshire.

Littleton was expelled from the East India Company in 1682. Later he was a founding director of the New East India Company, and was sent out to Bengal to act as President in its interest. He was knighted early in 1699. Later in that year he was at Calcutta, opposing John Beard of the old Company in Indian matters. It was some years before the two companies were amalgamated.

References

1705 deaths
English businesspeople
English MPs 1685–1687
Year of birth unknown
Presidents of Bengal
Heirs apparent who never acceded